The Azibo River is a Portuguese river in the Douro River basin. It has its source in the Nogueira mountains, near the place of Rebordainhos, Bragança Municipality, in the northeast of Portugal. 
Along its  of length, it crosses the Macedo de Cavaleiros Municipality, where in 1982 an earthfill dam was built near Santa Combinha place (Azibo Reservoir).
The Azibo river has its mouth near the place of Lagoa (Macedo de Cavaleiros Municipality), on the right bank of  Sabor River, which is a tributary of Douro River.

See also
Geography of Europe
List of European rivers with alternative names
Latin names of European rivers
European river zonation
 :pt:Anexo:Lista de rios de Portugal
 :pt:Lista de ribeiras de Portugal
 Azibo Reservoir Protected Landscape
 Macedo de Cavaleiros Municipality
 List of Birds of Azibo Reservoir Protected Landscape

Notes

External links 
 www.azibo.org
 Sistema Nacional de Informação de Recursos Hidricos
 Instituto da Água
 Hydrographic Map of Portugal (pdf)

Rivers of Portugal